San Vicente, officially the Municipality of San Vicente,  is a 1st class municipality in the province of Palawan, Philippines. According to the 2020 census, it has a population of 33,507 people.

San Vicente's  of beachfront, popularly called the Long Beach, is being converted into an emerging tourist destination that will be the beneficiary of government spending on infrastructure. The Long Beach have two rocky cliffs interrupting the continuous expanse of approximately 14.7 kilometers of sugary white sand beach dividing it into three coves. It is the longest white sand beach in the Philippines and is the First Flagship Tourism Enterprise Zone of the Tourism Infrastructure and Enterprise Zone Authority (TIEZA). The Long Beach spans to the coastline of four barangays namely Poblacion, New Agutaya, San Isidro and Alimanguan.

History 

In 1952, migrants from Manamoc, an island of the Cuyo Archipelago, arrived in a place called Malagnang ( muddy/ maputik) a sitio of Kemdeng, formerly part of Puerto Princesa. The first to arrive were the Dandal brothers (Anastacio, Ricardo, and Lauro), Alberto Radam, and Marcelino Gadiano with their families. After sometime their relatives followed forming a small community which gave rise to the election of Anastascio Dandal as the first Barrio Lieutenant.

The small ethnic group of Agutaynon and Cuyunon increased in number and with the increase disputes emerged particularly in the choice of the town's Patron Saint. The Cuyunon wanted Saint Vincent Ferrer while the choice of Agutaynon was Saint Isidro Labrador. The group decided to resolve the issue by drawing a lot. The name of Saint Vincent Ferrer was drawn thus the name Malagnang was changed to San Vicente.

The Municipality of San Vicente was created on June 21, 1969, by virtue of Republic Act 5821. It officially functioned as distinct municipality on January 2, 1972.

The present Municipality was created out of several barrios from the Municipalities of Taytay and Puerto Princesa (now a highly urbanized city). The barrio of New Agutaya up to the northernmost barrio of Binga used to be part of Taytay while the barrio of San Vicente (Poblacion) down to the southernmost barrio of Caruray were part of Puerto Princesa. The barrio of San Vicente used to be a sitio named Malagnang until it was upgraded into a barrio and renamed by a law in 1959.

Geography
San Vicente is nestled in the north-west of Palawan's mainland, bounded by the Philippine West Sea in the West, the municipality of Taytay in the north, Roxas in the East and City of Puerto Princesa in the Southwest. With a forest area of 82,080.09 hectares and 22 identified islands and islets within its municipal boundaries. San Vicente is located in the north-western side of the main island of Palawan and is 186 kilometers from Puerto Princesa City. It occupies a total land area of 165,797.6525 hectares.

Barangays
San Vicente is politically subdivided into 10 barangays.
 Alimanguan
 Binga
 Caruray
 New Villa Fria (Kemdeng)
 New Agutaya
 New Canipo
 Port Barton
 Poblacion (San Vicente)
 San Isidro
 Santo Niño

Climate

As with the general climate of the Philippine Archipelago, San Vicente's dry season begins in December, lasting until the month of May while the onset of the wet or rainy season is in June, usually drying up again in November. Northestern winds, the amihan prevail from November to May. Rough coastal waters characterize the season of habagat, or the south-western winds.

Demographics

In the 2010 NSO Census, San Vicente had a total population of 30,919 at a growth rate of 6%. Population increased by 3,500 from 27,065 in 2008 based on CBMS survey within a 2-year gap. The total number of households was 6,460 with average household size of 5 members.

Economy 

Fishing and farming are the major economic activities in San Vicente wherein 29.50% and 25.77% respectively are engaged in it. Rice and coconut are the major agricultural crops and fish products are adequate in the municipality.

San Vicente is predominantly fishing and a farming municipality and now gaining recognition as a center of interest for Tourism. San Vicente can offer a diverse range of attractions for adventure and nature enthusiasts. Roads and other infrastructure support facilities are now on its implementation process through the help of the National Government.

As San Vicente Palawan slowly emerges to become one of the tourism hot spot in the Philippines, the real industry sector becomes dramatically stronger. Many land owners who have more than tens of thousand hectare properties have earned millions of pesos on selling their lots to investors. Beach front properties sell like pancakes in the real estate market.

Many millionaires have ventured into land banking in San Vicente Palawan with its robust potential, earning exponentially from re-selling their acquired properties. Historically, rice field properties were sold at P300,000 per hectare in 2014. Three years later, an hectare big usually costs P3,000,000, with another increase after the San Vicente Airport started servicing small commercial planes.

Flagship Tourism Enterprise Zone (Flagship TEZ)

The introduction of the San Vicente Flagship TEZ was initiated with the marking of a Memorandum of Agreement (MOA) between the TIEZA and the nearby government unit (LGU) of San Vicente in 2013 – a fearless advance of the neighborhood organization to uphold association and set the course into tourism improvement.

To meet the vision proclamation as the Flagship TEZ and to be a model goal, a Tourism Master Plan was defined to coordinate, control and accomplish adjusted formative pushes and methodologies of the LGU towards an independent, socially capable and naturally stable group. The Tourism Master Plan expects to advance and encourage feasible and reasonable improvement in the region.

In light of the Integrated Tourism Master Plan for the Long Beach range, the Flagship TEZ should be zoned by its attributes and into topics to create tourism items, for example, however not restricted to sun and shoreline, relaxation and stimulation, recreational and sports tourism, eco-tourism and agri-tourism.

San Vicente Palawan Master Plan contains significant information about San Vicente, tourism projections based on other famous tourist destinations, proposed developments and proposed restrictions. The Master Plan also identifies key areas and divided San Vicente Palawan into 4 clusters, based on development and tourism potentials.

Culture
The diversity of San Vicente derives from its 24 ethno-linguistic resident groups, each with their own distinct dialects, and culture heritage. Filipino (Tagalog), however, remains the dominant lingua franca these diverse people that comprise San Vicente populace. In homage to its patron saint, San Vicente Ferrer, the municipality celebrates its town fiesta from April 1–5, Foundation Day on June 21 and Malagnang Festival on June 17–21 of every year.

Infrastructure

Aviation
The municipality as well as the northern municipalities of Palawan is served by the San Vicente Airport.

Energy
There are five barangays which are partly served by electricity. The present source of electricity are a 1 unit 500 KW, 1 unit 250 KW and 1 unit 160 KW generating sets operated by National Power Corporation (NAPOCOR) which is sold to consumers through Palawan Electric Cooperative (PALECO). Serving 24 hours since December 2014.

Water supply
The town has a water system which comes from the surface water of Little Baguio Falls.

Communication
There are two telecommunication companies, SMART and GLOBE which have installed cell site facilities in Sitio Pinagmangalucan in Barangay Poblacion, Barangay Alimanguan, Barangay Binga, Barangay Port Barton and Barangay Caruray. These modern facilities have made communication much easier, faster and convenient. Likewise cable and internet connection is already available in Barangays Poblacion, Alimanguan and Port Barton.

Environment
Endowed with white sand beaches, coral reefs, islands and islets, waterfalls, vast forest cover, mangroves, and varied endemic flora, San Vicente serves as habitat for 23 of the 25 wildlife species found in the island of Palawan.

Gallery

References

External links

San Vicente Profile at PhilAtlas.com
[ Philippine Standard Geographic Code]
Philippine Census Information
Local Governance Performance Management System
San Vicente, Palawan

Municipalities of Palawan
Beaches of the Philippines